Prunella is a feminine given name. The name is derived from the Latin for plum.

The usual diminutive or short form is Pru or Prue. These may also be short for the unrelated name Prudence.

People with this name
 Prunella Clough (1919–1999), a prominent British artist
 Prunella Gee (born 1950), an English actress
 Prunella Ransome (1943–2002), an English actress
 Prunella Scales (born 1932), a British actress

Fictional characters
 Prunella Deegan, a child in the children's book and the animated television series Arthur
 Prunella, the title character in the Italian fairy tale "Prunella"
 Prunella Gentleman, heroine of the novel Sorcerer of the Crown by Zen Cho

See also
Prunella (disambiguation)

Feminine given names